Vashti is a 1879 oil on canvas painting by the English painter Edwin Long depicting a character in the book of Esther in the Hebrew Bible. Long was greatly influenced by the paintings of Velasquez and other Spanish masters, and his earlier pictures. It was housed in the Museum and Gallery at Bob Jones University.

Description 
His painting of Vashti captures the dramatic opening of the biblical narrative Vashti's refusal of the King's summons. Vashti was Queen of Persia and the first wife of Persian King Ahasuerus in the Book of Esther. Ahasuerus ordered his chief eunuchs to carry out his command to bring Queen Vashti to stand before his courtiers and show off her exceptional beauty. But she was refused. She was banished for her refusal to appear at the king's banquet to show off her beauty as the king wished. She is viewed as an independent-minded heroine in feminism.

References 

Portraits of women